Erkan Sözeri (born 19 May 1966) is a Turkish football coach and former player who currently serves as the manager of Bandırmaspor. He is best known for his playing career with Gençlerbirliği in the Turkish Süper Lig.

Professional career
Erkan begun his professional career with Gaziantepspor, whom he helped promote to the Süper Lig. He moved to Trabzonspor where he won the Turkish Cup, before transferring to Gençlerbirliği where he spent the majority of his professional career. At the age of 32, he moved to Fenerbahçe, before finishing his career at Göztepe.

Managerial career
Erkan managed a variety of Turkish clubs in the TFF First League and TFF Second League before coaching the professional Kardemir Karabükspor in the Turkish Süper Lig. On 25 September 2017 he resigned from Karabükspor after a series of bad results, and is currently at Gazişehir Gaziantep F.K.

Honours

Club
Trabzonspor
Turkish Cup: 1991–92

References

External links
 
 TFF Manager Profile
 
 Mackolik Manager Profile

1966 births
Living people
Sportspeople from Ankara
Turkish footballers
Turkish football managers
Gençlerbirliği S.K. footballers
Göztepe S.K. footballers
Çaykur Rizespor footballers
Fenerbahçe S.K. footballers
Trabzonspor footballers
Gaziantepspor footballers
Süper Lig players
TFF First League players
Gaziantep F.K. managers
Kardemir Karabükspor managers
Adana Demirspor managers
Orduspor managers
Türk Telekom GSK managers
Şanlıurfaspor managers
Süper Lig managers
Association football fullbacks
Ümraniyespor managers